Boulayotte is a settlement in Senegal.

External links
PEPAM

Populated places in the Bignona Department
Arrondissement of Sindian